The Campeonato Nacional de Rugby I Divisão is the second tier competition of the Portuguese domestic rugby championship and is organised by the Portuguese Rugby Federation. The winner gets promoted to the Campeonato Português de Rugby and the last positioned team gets relegated to the Campeonato Nacional de Rugby II Divisão. The current champions are GDS Cascais, from Cascais. The league consists of 10 teams.

Season 2018-19 teams
 Benfica
 Caldas
 CRAV
 Évora
 Guimarães
 Lousã
 Moita
 Montemor
 Santarém
 São Miguel

Champions

"

See also
 Rugby union in Portugal

References

External links
 Portuguese Rugby Federation Official Website

Rugby union leagues in Portugal
Port